Mbarali District is one of the seven districts of Mbeya Region, Tanzania.  It is bordered to the north by Iringa region and east by Njombe region. To the south the district is bordered by Mbeya Rural District and to the west by Chunya District.

In 2016 the Tanzania National Bureau of Statistics report there were 331,206 people in the district, from 300,517 in 2012.

Mbarali district is the most famous area for rice farming. The district is home to Kapunga rice project and Mbarali estate. The district hosts a very famous wetland called Ihefu, as well as the Usangu plain. Ruaha National Park is within the district to the north side.

Wards

The Mbarali District is administratively divided into 20 wards:

 Chimala
 Itamboleo
 Igava
 Imalilo Songwe
 Ihahi
 Lugelele
 Igurusi
 Madibira
 Mahongole
 Mapogoro
 Mawindi
 Luhanga
 Kongolo
 Mwatenga
 Miyombweni
 Ipwani
 Ruiwa
 Rujewa
 Ubaruku
 Utengule/Usangu

Education and transportation
In the case of education, Mbarali district has several public and private schools in both primary and secondary levels. The famous schools like St Ann's and Montfort are within the district. Also an advanced level secondary school called Madibira high school is within the district. TANZAM-HIGHWAY passes in the southern part of the district. The road links the towns of Igawa, Chimala and Igurusi with the cities of Dar es Salaam and Mbeya as well as the neighbouring countries like Malawi and Zambia. A railway line called TAZARA which connects the two countries Tanzania and Zambia, runs in the district.

References 

Districts of Mbeya Region